The Roman Catholic Diocese of Tanga is a diocese located in the city of Tanga in the Ecclesiastical province of Dar-es-Salaam in Tanzania.

History
 April 18, 1950: Established as Apostolic Prefecture of Tanga from the Apostolic Vicariate of Kilima-Njaro
 February 24, 1958: Promoted as Diocese of Tanga

Bishops
 Prefect Apostolic of Tanga (Roman rite) 
 Fr. Eugène Cornelius Arthurs, I.C. (1950.06.09 – 1958.02.24 see below)
 Bishops of Tanga (Roman rite)
 Bishop Eugène Cornelius Arthurs, I.C. (see above 1958.02.24 – 1969.12.15)
 Bishop Maurus Gervase Komba (1969.12.15 – 1988.01.18)
 Bishop Telesphore Mkude (1988.01.18 – 1993.04.05), appointed Bishop of Morogoro 
 Bishop Anthony Mathias Banzi (1994.06.10 – 2020.12.20)

Other priest of this diocese who became bishop
Titus Joseph Mdoe, appointed auxiliary bishop of Dar-es-Salaam in 2013

See also
Roman Catholicism in Tanzania

Sources
 GCatholic.org
 Catholic Hierarchy

Tanga
Tanga
Tanga
Tanga, Roman Catholic Diocese of
1950 establishments in Tanganyika